Ravindra Sadanand Phatak is Shiv Sena Politician from Thane district, Maharashtra. He is current Member of Legislative Council of Maharashtra as a member of Shiv Sena representing Thane Local Authorities constituency. He had been elected as standing Committee chairman of Thane Municipal Corporation for two terms in 2005 and 2012.
He had unsuccessfully contested Maharashtra Legislative Assembly election from Thane Vidhan Sabha Constituency in 2014.

Positions held
 2002: Elected as corporator in Thane Municipal Corporation
 2005: Elected as standing Committee chairman of Thane Municipal Corporation
 2007: Re-elected as corporator in Thane Municipal Corporation
 2012: Re-elected as corporator in Thane Municipal Corporation 
 2012: Elected as standing Committee chairman of Thane Municipal Corporation 
 2015: Re-elected as corporator in Thane Municipal Corporation

References

External links
 Shivsena Home Page
 ठाणे महानगरपालिका

Living people
Marathi politicians
Shiv Sena politicians
People from Thane district
Year of birth missing (living people)